Kannazuki is the tenth month of the Japanese calendar.

Kannazuki may refer to:

 Kannazuki no Miko, a yuri manga series
 Satoshi Okumura,  a Japanese comedian